Jirga with Saleem Safi or Jirga is a television current affairs talk show on Geo News, broadcast from Islamabad, Pakistan every Saturday and Sunday from 10:05 PM to 11:05 PM. The program is hosted by Saleem Safi.

References

Geo News
Pakistani television talk shows
Geo TV original programming